Tennessee was admitted to the Union on June 1, 1796. Its United States Senate seats were declared vacant in March 1862 owing to its secession from the Union. They were again filled from July 1866. Tennessee's current senators are Republicans Marsha Blackburn and Bill Hagerty. Kenneth McKellar was Tennessee's longest-serving senator (1917–1953).

List of senators

|- style="height:2em"
| colspan=3 | Vacant
| Jun 1, 1796 –Aug 2, 1796
| Tennessee did not elect its senators until two months .
| rowspan=2 | 1
| rowspan=2 
| rowspan=7 | 1
| Tennessee did not elect its senators until two months .
| Jun 1, 1796 –Aug 2, 1796
| colspan=3 | Vacant

|- style="height:2em"
! rowspan=3 | 1
| rowspan=3 align=left | William Cocke
| rowspan=3  | Democratic-Republican
| rowspan=3 nowrap | Aug 2, 1796 –Sep 26, 1797
| Elected in 1796.
| rowspan=2 | Elected in 1796.Expelled for conspiracy with the Kingdom of Great Britain.
| rowspan=2 nowrap | Aug 2, 1796 –Jul 8, 1797
| rowspan=2  | Democratic-Republican
| rowspan=2 align=right | William Blount
! rowspan=2 | 1

|- style="height:2em"
| rowspan=2 | Appointed to begin the term due to legislature's failure to elect.Lost re-election.
| rowspan=7 | 2
| rowspan=5 

|- style="height:2em"
|  
| nowrap | Jul 8, 1797 –Sep 26, 1797
| colspan=3 | Vacant

|- style="height:2em"
! 2
| align=left | Andrew Jackson
|  | Democratic-Republican
| nowrap | Sep 26, 1797 –Apr 1, 1798
| Elected to finish Cocke's term.Resigned.
| rowspan=3 | Elected to finish Blount's term.Resigned when elected to the Class 1 seat.
| rowspan=3 nowrap | Sep 26, 1797 –Mar 3, 1799
| rowspan=3  | Democratic-Republican
| rowspan=3 align=right | Joseph Anderson
! rowspan=3 | 2

|- style="height:2em"
| colspan=3 | Vacant
| nowrap | Apr 1, 1798 –Oct 6, 1798
|  

|- style="height:2em"
! 3
| align=left | Daniel Smith
|  | Democratic-Republican
| nowrap | Oct 6, 1798 –Mar 3, 1799
| Appointed to finish Jackson's term.Retired.

|- style="height:2em"
! rowspan=14 | 4
| rowspan=2 align=left | Joseph Anderson
| rowspan=2  | Democratic-Republican
| rowspan=2 nowrap | Mar 4, 1799 –Mar 3, 1803
| rowspan=2 | Elected in 1798 to finish Jackson's term.
| 
| rowspan=4 | 2
| rowspan=4 | Elected in 1798.Retired or lost re-election.
| rowspan=4 nowrap | Mar 4, 1799 –Mar 3, 1805
| rowspan=4  | Democratic-Republican
| rowspan=4 align=right | William Cocke
! rowspan=4 | 3

|- style="height:2em"
| 

|- style="height:2em"
| colspan=2 | Vacant
| nowrap | Mar 4, 1803 –Sep 22, 1803
| Legislature failed to elect.
| rowspan=4 | 3
| rowspan=2 

|- style="height:2em"
| rowspan=11 align=left | Joseph Anderson
| rowspan=11  | Democratic-Republican
| rowspan=3 nowrap | Sep 22, 1803 –Mar 3, 1809
| rowspan=3 | Re-elected late in 1803.

|- style="height:2em"
| 
| rowspan=5 | 3
| rowspan=3 | Elected early in 1803.Resigned.
| rowspan=3 nowrap | Mar 4, 1805 –Mar 31, 1809
| rowspan=3  | Democratic-Republican
| rowspan=3 align=right | Daniel Smith
! rowspan=3 | 4

|- style="height:2em"
| 

|- style="height:2em"
| rowspan=2 nowrap | Mar 4, 1809 –Apr 11, 1809
| rowspan=2 | Appointed to begin the term due to legislature's failure to elect.
| rowspan=8 | 4
| rowspan=3 

|- style="height:2em"
|  
| nowrap | Apr 1, 1809 –Apr 11, 1809
| colspan=3 | Vacant

|- style="height:2em"
| rowspan=6 nowrap | Apr 11, 1809 –Mar 3, 1815
| rowspan=6 | Re-elected late in 1809.Retired.
| Elected to finish Smith's term.
| rowspan=2 nowrap | Apr 11, 1809 –Oct 8, 1811
| rowspan=2  | Democratic-Republican
| rowspan=2 align=right | Jenkin Whiteside
! rowspan=2 | 5

|- style="height:2em"
| rowspan=2 
| rowspan=7 | 4
| Re-elected early in 1809.Resigned.

|- style="height:2em"
| rowspan=2 | Elected in 1811 to finish Whiteside's term.Resigned.
| rowspan=2 nowrap | Oct 8, 1811 –Feb 11, 1814
| rowspan=2  | Democratic-Republican
| rowspan=2 align=right | George W. Campbell
! rowspan=2 | 6

|- style="height:2em"
| rowspan=3 

|- style="height:2em"
|  
| nowrap | Feb 12, 1814 –Mar 16, 1814
| colspan=3 | Vacant

|- style="height:2em"
| rowspan=2 | Appointed to continue Campbell's term.Retired when his successor was elected.
| rowspan=2 nowrap | Mar 17, 1814 –Oct 10, 1815
| rowspan=2  | Democratic-Republican
| rowspan=2 align=right | Jesse Wharton
! rowspan=2 | 7

|- style="height:2em"
| colspan=3 | Vacant
| nowrap | Mar 4, 1815 –Oct 10, 1815
| 
| rowspan=6 | 5
| rowspan=2 

|- style="height:2em"
! rowspan=2 | 5
| rowspan=2 align=left | George W. Campbell
| rowspan=2  | Democratic-Republican
| rowspan=2 nowrap | Oct 10, 1815 –Apr 20, 1818
| rowspan=2 | Elected late in 1815.Resigned.
| Elected to finish Campbell's term.Legislature failed to elect.
| rowspan=7 nowrap | Oct 10, 1815 –Mar 3, 1823
| rowspan=7  | Democratic-Republican
| rowspan=7 align=right | John Williams
! rowspan=7 | 8

|- style="height:2em"
| rowspan=3 
| rowspan=6 | 5
| rowspan=6 | Appointed to begin the term.Elected in 1817 to finish the term.Lost re-election.

|- style="height:2em"
| colspan=3 | Vacant
| nowrap | Apr 20, 1818 –Sep 27, 1818
|  

|- style="height:2em"
! rowspan=10 | 6
| rowspan=2 align=left | John Eaton
| rowspan=2  | Democratic-Republican
| rowspan=2 nowrap | Sep 5, 1818 –Mar 4, 1821
| rowspan=2 | Appointed to continue Campbell's term.Elected in 1819 to finish Campbell's term.

|- style="height:2em"
| 

|- style="height:2em"
| colspan=2 | Vacant
| nowrap | Mar 4, 1821 –Sep 27, 1821
| Legislature failed to elect.
| rowspan=6 | 6
| rowspan=2 

|- style="height:2em"
| rowspan=7 align=left | John Eaton
| rowspan=2  | Democratic-Republican
| rowspan=7 nowrap | Sep 27, 1821 –Mar 9, 1829
| rowspan=5 | Re-elected late in 1821.

|- style="height:2em"
| 
| rowspan=5 | 6
| rowspan=2 | Elected in 1823.Resigned.
| rowspan=2 nowrap | Mar 4, 1823 –Oct 14, 1825
|  | Democratic-Republican
| rowspan=2 align=right | Andrew Jackson
! rowspan=2 | 9

|- style="height:2em"
| rowspan=5  | Jacksonian
| rowspan=3 
|  | Jacksonian

|- style="height:2em"
|  
| nowrap | Oct 15, 1825 –Oct 27, 1825
| colspan=3 | Vacant

|- style="height:2em"
| rowspan=2 | Elected to finish Jackson's term.
| rowspan=13 nowrap | Oct 28, 1825 –Jan 13, 1840
| rowspan=7  | Jacksonian
| rowspan=13 align=right | Hugh Lawson White
! rowspan=13 | 10

|- style="height:2em"
| rowspan=2 | Re-elected in 1826.Resigned to become U.S. Secretary of War.
| rowspan=5 | 7
| 

|- style="height:2em"
| rowspan=3 
| rowspan=5 | 7
| rowspan=5 | Re-elected in 1829.

|- style="height:2em"
| colspan=3 | Vacant
| nowrap | Mar 9, 1829 –Oct 19, 1829
|  

|- style="height:2em"
! rowspan=5 | 7
| rowspan=5 align=left | Felix Grundy
| rowspan=4  | Jacksonian
| rowspan=5 nowrap | Oct 19, 1829 –Jul 4, 1838
| rowspan=2 | Elected to finish Eaton's term.

|- style="height:2em"
| 

|- style="height:2em"
| rowspan=3 | Re-elected in 1833.Resigned to become U.S. Attorney General.
| rowspan=5 | 8
| 

|- style="height:2em"
| 
| rowspan=10 | 8
| rowspan=6 | Re-elected in 1835.Resigned.
|  | NationalRepublican

|- style="height:2em"
|  | Democratic
| rowspan=3 
| rowspan=5  | Whig

|- style="height:2em"
| colspan=3 | Vacant
| nowrap | Jul 5, 1838 –Sep 16, 1838
|  

|- style="height:2em"
! 8
| align=left | Ephraim H. Foster
|  | Whig
| nowrap | Sep 17, 1838 –Mar 3, 1839
| Elected to finish Grundy's term.Re-elected but resigned.

|- style="height:2em"
| colspan=3 | Vacant
| nowrap | Mar 3, 1839 –Nov 19, 1839
|  
| rowspan=10 | 9
| rowspan=6 

|- style="height:2em"
! rowspan=3 | 9
| rowspan=3 align=left | Felix Grundy
| rowspan=3  | Democratic
| rowspan=3 nowrap | Nov 19, 1839 –Dec 19, 1840
| rowspan=3 | Elected late in 1839.Died.

|- style="height:2em"
|  
| nowrap | Jan 13, 1840 –Feb 25, 1840
| colspan=3 | Vacant

|- style="height:2em"
| rowspan=3 | Elected to finish White's term.Retired.
| rowspan=3 nowrap | Feb 25, 1840 –Mar 3, 1841
| rowspan=3  | Democratic
| rowspan=3 align=right | Alexander O. Anderson
! rowspan=3 | 11

|- style="height:2em"
| colspan=3 | Vacant
| nowrap | Dec 19, 1840 –Dec 25, 1840
|  

|- style="height:2em"
! rowspan=2 | 10
| rowspan=2 align=left | Alfred O. P. Nicholson
| rowspan=2  | Democratic
| rowspan=2 nowrap | Dec 25, 1840 –Feb 7, 1842
| rowspan=2 | Appointed to continue Grundy's term.Resigned.

|- style="height:2em"
| rowspan=2 
| rowspan=5 | 9
| rowspan=3 | Legislature failed to elect.
| rowspan=3 nowrap | Mar 4, 1841 –Oct 17, 1843
| rowspan=3 colspan=3 | Vacant

|- style="height:2em"
| rowspan=2 colspan=3 | Vacant
| rowspan=2 nowrap | Feb 7, 1842 –Oct 17, 1843
| rowspan=2 |  

|- style="height:2em"
| rowspan=2 

|- style="height:2em"
! 11
| align=left | Ephraim H. Foster
|  | Whig
| nowrap | Oct 17, 1843 –Mar 3, 1845
| Elected to finish Grundy's term.Retired or lost re-election.
| rowspan=2 | Elected to finish the vacant term.Lost re-election.
| rowspan=2 nowrap | Oct 17, 1843 –Mar 3, 1847
| rowspan=2  | Whig
| rowspan=2 align=right | Spencer Jarnagin
! rowspan=2 | 12

|- style="height:2em"
! rowspan=4 | 12
| rowspan=4 align=left | Hopkins L. Turney
| rowspan=4  | Democratic
| rowspan=4 nowrap | Mar 4, 1845 –Mar 3, 1851
| rowspan=4 | Elected in 1844.Retired or lost re-election.
| rowspan=4 | 10
| 

|- style="height:2em"
| rowspan=2 
| rowspan=4 | 10
| Legislature failed to elect.
| nowrap | Mar 4, 1847 –Nov 21, 1847
| colspan=3 | Vacant

|- style="height:2em"
| rowspan=3 | Elected late in 1847
| rowspan=7 nowrap | Nov 22, 1847 –Mar 3, 1859
| rowspan=5  | Whig
| rowspan=7 align=right | John Bell
! rowspan=7 | 13

|- style="height:2em"
| 

|- style="height:2em"
! rowspan=3 | 13
| rowspan=3 align=left | James C. Jones
| rowspan=3  | Whig
| rowspan=3 nowrap | Mar 4, 1851 –Mar 3, 1857
| rowspan=3 | Elected in 1851.Retired.
| rowspan=3 | 11
| 

|- style="height:2em"
| 
| rowspan=4 | 11
| rowspan=4 | Re-elected in 1853.Retired or lost re-election.

|- style="height:2em"
| 

|- style="height:2em"
| colspan=3 | Vacant
| nowrap | Mar 4, 1857 –Oct 8, 1857
| Legislature failed to elect.
| rowspan=5 | 12
| rowspan=2 
| rowspan=2  | Know-Nothing

|- style="height:2em"
! rowspan=3 | 14
| rowspan=3 align=left | Andrew Johnson
| rowspan=3  | Democratic
| rowspan=3 nowrap | Oct 8, 1857 –Mar 4, 1862
| rowspan=3 | Elected in 1857 to finish the term.Resigned to become Military Governor of Tennessee.

|- style="height:2em"
| 
| rowspan=4 | 12
| Elected in 1858.Withdrew in anticipation of secession.
| nowrap | Mar 4, 1859 –Mar 3, 1861
|  | Democratic
| align=right | Alfred O. P. Nicholson
! 14

|- style="height:2em"
| rowspan=2 
| rowspan=4 | Civil War and Reconstruction
| rowspan=4 nowrap | Mar 4, 1861 –Jul 24, 1866
| rowspan=4 colspan=3 | Vacant

|- style="height:2em"
| rowspan=3 colspan=3 | Vacant
| rowspan=3 nowrap | Mar 4, 1862 –Jul 24, 1866
| rowspan=3 | Civil War and Reconstruction

|- style="height:2em"
| rowspan=4 | 13
| 

|- style="height:2em"
| rowspan=2 
| rowspan=4 | 13

|- style="height:2em"
! rowspan=2 | 15
| rowspan=2 align=left | David T. Patterson
|  | Unionist
| rowspan=2 nowrap | Jul 24, 1866 –Mar 3, 1869
| rowspan=2 | Elected to finish the vacant term.Retired.
| rowspan=3 | Elected to finish the vacant term.Retired.
| rowspan=3 nowrap | Jul 24, 1866 –Mar 3, 1871
|  | Unionist
| rowspan=3 align=right | Joseph S. Fowler
! rowspan=3 | 15

|- style="height:2em"
|  | Democratic
| 
| rowspan=2  | Republican

|- style="height:2em"
! rowspan=3 | 16
| rowspan=3 align=left | William G. Brownlow
| rowspan=3  | Republican
| rowspan=3 nowrap | Mar 4, 1869 –Mar 3, 1875
| rowspan=3 | Elected in 1867.Retired.
| rowspan=3 | 14
| 

|- style="height:2em"
| 
| rowspan=6 | 14
| rowspan=6 | Elected in 1870 or 1871.Retired.
| rowspan=6 nowrap | Mar 4, 1871 –Mar 3, 1877
| rowspan=6  | Democratic
| rowspan=6 align=right | Henry Cooper
! rowspan=6 | 16

|- style="height:2em"
| 

|- style="height:2em"
! 17
| align=left | Andrew Johnson
|  | Democratic
| nowrap | Mar 4, 1875 –Jul 31, 1875
| Elected in 1875.Died.
| rowspan=6 | 15
| rowspan=4 

|- style="height:2em"
| colspan=3 | Vacant
| nowrap | Jul 31, 1875 –Aug 18, 1875
|  

|- style="height:2em"
! 18
| align=left | David M. Key
|  | Democratic
| nowrap | Aug 18, 1875 –Jan 19, 1877
| Appointed to continue Johnson's term.Lost election to finish Johnson's term.

|- style="height:2em"
! rowspan=3 | 19
| rowspan=3 align=left | James E. Bailey
| rowspan=3  | Democratic
| rowspan=3 nowrap | Jan 19, 1877 –Mar 3, 1881
| rowspan=3 | Elected to finish Johnson's term.Lost re-election.

|- style="height:2em"
| 
| rowspan=3 | 15
| rowspan=3 | Elected in 1877.
| rowspan=13 nowrap | Mar 4, 1877 –Jul 8, 1897
| rowspan=13  | Democratic
| rowspan=13 align=right | Isham G. Harris
! rowspan=13 | 17

|- style="height:2em"
| 

|- style="height:2em"
! rowspan=3 | 20
| rowspan=3 align=left | Howell Jackson
| rowspan=3  | Democratic
| rowspan=3 nowrap | Mar 4, 1881 –Apr 14, 1886
| rowspan=3 | Elected in 1880 or 1881.Resigned to become U.S. Circuit Judge.
| rowspan=5 | 16
| 

|- style="height:2em"
| 
| rowspan=5 | 16
| rowspan=5 | Re-elected in 1883.

|- style="height:2em"
| rowspan=3 

|- style="height:2em"
| colspan=3 | Vacant
| nowrap | Apr 14, 1886 –Apr 16, 1886
|  

|- style="height:2em"
! 21
| align=left | Washington Whitthorne
|  | Democratic
| nowrap | Apr 16, 1886 –Mar 3, 1887
| Appointed to finish Jackson's term.Retired to serve in the U.S. House.

|- style="height:2em"
! rowspan=12 | 22
| rowspan=12 align=left | William B. Bate
| rowspan=12  | Democratic
| rowspan=12 nowrap | Mar 4, 1887 –Mar 9, 1905
| rowspan=3 | Elected in 1887.
| rowspan=3 | 17
| 

|- style="height:2em"
| 
| rowspan=3 | 17
| rowspan=3 | Re-elected in 1889.

|- style="height:2em"
| 

|- style="height:2em"
| rowspan=5 | Re-elected in 1893.
| rowspan=5 | 18
| 

|- style="height:2em"
| 
| rowspan=5 | 18
| rowspan=2 | Re-elected in 1895.Died.

|- style="height:2em"
| rowspan=3 

|- style="height:2em"
|  
| nowrap | Jul 9, 1897 –Jul 19, 1897
| colspan=3 | Vacant

|- style="height:2em"
| rowspan=2 | Appointed to continue Harris's term.Elected in 1898 to finish Harris's term.Retired.
| rowspan=2 nowrap | Jul 20, 1897 –Mar 3, 1901
| rowspan=2  | Democratic
| rowspan=2 align=right | Thomas B. Turley
! rowspan=2 | 18

|- style="height:2em"
| rowspan=3 | Re-elected in 1899
| rowspan=3 | 19
| 

|- style="height:2em"
| 
| rowspan=5 | 19
| rowspan=5 | Elected in 1901.Lost renomination.
| rowspan=5 nowrap | Mar 4, 1901 –Mar 3, 1907
| rowspan=5  | Democratic
| rowspan=5 align=right | Edward W. Carmack
! rowspan=5 | 19

|- style="height:2em"
| 

|- style="height:2em"
| Re-elected in 1905.Died.
| rowspan=5 | 20
| rowspan=3 

|- style="height:2em"
| colspan=3 | Vacant
| nowrap | Mar 10, 1905 –Mar 20, 1905
|  

|- style="height:2em"
! rowspan=3 | 23
| rowspan=3 align=left | James B. Frazier
| rowspan=3  | Democratic
| rowspan=3 nowrap | Mar 21, 1905 –Mar 3, 1911
| rowspan=3 | Elected to finish Bate's term.Lost re-election.

|- style="height:2em"
| 
| rowspan=6 | 20
| rowspan=3 | Elected in 1907.Died.
| rowspan=3 nowrap | Mar 4, 1907 –Mar 31, 1912
| rowspan=3  | Democratic
| rowspan=3 align=right | Robert Love Taylor
! rowspan=3 | 20

|- style="height:2em"
| 

|- style="height:2em"
! rowspan=6 | 24
| rowspan=6 align=left | Luke Lea
| rowspan=6  | Democratic
| rowspan=6 nowrap | Mar 4, 1911 –Mar 3, 1917
| rowspan=6 | Elected in 1911.Lost renomination.
| rowspan=6 | 21
| rowspan=4 

|- style="height:2em"
|  
| nowrap | Apr 1, 1912 –Apr 10, 1912
| colspan=3 | Vacant

|- style="height:2em"
| Appointed to continue Taylor's term.Retired when his successor was elected.
| nowrap | Apr 11, 1912 –Jan 24, 1913
|  | Republican
| align=right | Newell Sanders
! 21

|- style="height:2em"
| Elected to finish Taylor's term.Retired.
| nowrap | Jan 24, 1913 –Mar 3, 1913
|  | Democratic
| align=right | William R. Webb
! 22

|- style="height:2em"
| 
| rowspan=3 | 21
| rowspan=3 | Elected in 1913.
| rowspan=6 nowrap | Mar 4, 1913 –Mar 3, 1925
| rowspan=6  | Democratic
| rowspan=6 align=right | John K. Shields
! rowspan=6 | 23

|- style="height:2em"
| 

|- style="height:2em"
! rowspan=23 | 25
| rowspan=23 align=left | Kenneth McKellar
| rowspan=23  | Democratic
| rowspan=23 nowrap | Mar 4, 1917 –Jan 3, 1953
| rowspan=3 | Elected in 1916.
| rowspan=3 | 22
| 

|- style="height:2em"
| 
| rowspan=3 | 22
| rowspan=3 | Re-elected in 1918.Lost renomination.

|- style="height:2em"
| 

|- style="height:2em"
| rowspan=3 | Re-elected in 1922.
| rowspan=3 | 23
| 

|- style="height:2em"
| 
| rowspan=5 | 23
| rowspan=3 | Elected in 1924.Died.
| rowspan=3 nowrap | Mar 4, 1925 –Aug 24, 1929
| rowspan=3  | Democratic
| rowspan=3 align=right | Lawrence Tyson
! rowspan=3 | 24

|- style="height:2em"
| 

|- style="height:2em"
| rowspan=5 | Re-elected in 1928.
| rowspan=5 | 24
| rowspan=3 

|- style="height:2em"
|  
| nowrap | Aug 25, 1929 –Sep 1, 1929
| colspan=3 | Vacant

|- style="height:2em"
| Appointed to continue Tyson's term.Elected in 1930 to finish Tyson's term.Retired.
| nowrap | Sep 2, 1929 –Mar 3, 1931
|  | Democratic
| align=right | William E. Brock
! 25

|- style="height:2em"
| 
| rowspan=3 | 24
| Elected in 1930.Resigned to become U.S. Secretary of State.
| nowrap | Mar 4, 1931 –Mar 3, 1933
|  | Democratic
| align=right | Cordell Hull
! 26

|- style="height:2em"
| 
| rowspan=2 | Appointed to continue Hull's term.Elected in 1934 to finish Hull's term.
| rowspan=3 nowrap | Mar 4, 1933 –Apr 23, 1937
| rowspan=3  | Democratic
| rowspan=3 align=right | Nathan L. Bachman
! rowspan=3 | 27

|- style="height:2em"
| rowspan=6 | Re-elected in 1934.
| rowspan=6 | 25
| 

|- style="height:2em"
| rowspan=4 
| rowspan=6 | 25
| Re-elected in 1936.Died.

|- style="height:2em"
|  
| nowrap | Apr 24, 1937 –May 5, 1937
| colspan=3 | Vacant

|- style="height:2em"
| Appointed to continue Bachman's term.Retired when his successor was elected.
| nowrap | May 6, 1937 –Nov 8, 1938
|  | Democratic
| align=right | George L. Berry
! 28

|- style="height:2em"
| rowspan=3 | Elected to finish Bachman's term.Did not take his seat until 1939 in order to remain District Attorney General.
| rowspan=6 nowrap | Nov 9, 1938 –Jan 3, 1949
| rowspan=6  | Democratic
| rowspan=6 align=right | Tom Stewart
! rowspan=6 | 29

|- style="height:2em"
| 

|- style="height:2em"
| rowspan=3 | Re-elected in 1940.
| rowspan=3 | 26
| 

|- style="height:2em"
| 
| rowspan=3 | 26
| rowspan=3 | Re-elected in 1942.Lost renomination.

|- style="height:2em"
| 

|- style="height:2em"
| rowspan=3 | Re-elected in 1946.Lost renomination.
| rowspan=3 | 27
| 

|- style="height:2em"
| 
| rowspan=3 | 27
| rowspan=3 | Elected in 1948.
| rowspan=8 nowrap | Jan 3, 1949 –Aug 10, 1963
| rowspan=8  | Democratic
| rowspan=8 align=right | Estes Kefauver
! rowspan=8 | 30

|- style="height:2em"
| 

|- style="height:2em"
! rowspan=12 | 26
| rowspan=12 align=left | Albert A. Gore
| rowspan=12  | Democratic
| rowspan=12 nowrap | Jan 3, 1953 –Jan 3, 1971
| rowspan=3 | Elected in 1952.
| rowspan=3 | 28
| 

|- style="height:2em"
| 
| rowspan=3 | 28
| rowspan=3 | Re-elected in 1954.

|- style="height:2em"
| 

|- style="height:2em"
| rowspan=6 | Re-elected in 1958.
| rowspan=6 | 29
| 

|- style="height:2em"
| 
| rowspan=6 | 29
| rowspan=2 | Re-elected in 1960.Died.

|- style="height:2em"
| rowspan=4 

|- style="height:2em"
|  
| nowrap | Aug 10, 1963 –Aug 20, 1963
| colspan=3 | Vacant

|- style="height:2em"
| Appointed to continue Kefauver's termRetired
| nowrap | Aug 20, 1963 –Nov 3, 1964
|  | Democratic
| align=right | Herbert S. Walters
! 31

|- style="height:2em"
| rowspan=2 | Elected to finish Kefauver's term.Lost renomination.
| rowspan=2 nowrap | Nov 4, 1964 –Jan 2, 1967
| rowspan=2  | Democratic
| rowspan=2 align=right | Ross Bass
! rowspan=2 | 32

|- style="height:2em"
| rowspan=3 | Re-elected in 1964.Lost re-election.
| rowspan=3 | 30
| 

|- style="height:2em"
| 
| rowspan=3 | 30
| rowspan=3 | Elected in 1966.
| rowspan=9 nowrap | Jan 3, 1967 –Jan 3, 1985
| rowspan=9  | Republican
| rowspan=9 align=right | Howard H. Baker Jr.
! rowspan=9 | 33

|- style="height:2em"
| 

|- style="height:2em"
! rowspan=3 | 27
| rowspan=3 align=left | Bill Brock
| rowspan=3  | Republican
| rowspan=3 nowrap | Jan 3, 1971 –Jan 3, 1977
| rowspan=3 | Elected in 1970.Lost re-election.
| rowspan=3 | 31
| 

|- style="height:2em"
| 
| rowspan=3 | 31
| rowspan=3 | Re-elected in 1972.

|- style="height:2em"
| 

|- style="height:2em"
! rowspan=11 | 28
| rowspan=11 align=left | Jim Sasser
| rowspan=11  | Democratic
| rowspan=11 nowrap | Jan 3, 1977 –Jan 3, 1995
| rowspan=3 | Elected in 1976.
| rowspan=3 | 32
| 

|- style="height:2em"
| 
| rowspan=3 | 32
| rowspan=3 | Re-elected in 1978.Retired.

|- style="height:2em"
| 

|- style="height:2em"
| rowspan=3 | Re-elected in 1982.
| rowspan=3 | 33
| 

|- style="height:2em"
| 
| rowspan=3 | 33
| rowspan=3 | Elected in 1984.
| rowspan=4 nowrap | Jan 3, 1985 –Jan 2, 1993
| rowspan=4  | Democratic
| rowspan=4 align=right | Al Gore
! rowspan=4 | 34

|- style="height:2em"
| 

|- style="height:2em"
| rowspan=5 | Re-elected in 1988.Lost re-election.
| rowspan=5 | 34
| 

|- style="height:2em"
| rowspan=2 
| rowspan=5 | 34
| Re-elected in 1990.Resigned to become U.S. Vice President.

|- style="height:2em"
| rowspan=2 | Appointed to continue Gore's term.Retired when his successor was elected.
| rowspan=2 nowrap | Jan 2, 1993 –Dec 2, 1994
| rowspan=2  | Democratic
| rowspan=2 align=right | Harlan Mathews
! rowspan=2 | 35

|- style="height:2em"
| rowspan=2 

|- style="height:2em"
| rowspan=2 | Elected in 1994 to finish Gore's term.
| rowspan=5 nowrap | Dec 2, 1994 –Jan 3, 2003
| rowspan=5  | Republican
| rowspan=5 align=right | Fred Thompson
! rowspan=5 | 36

|- style="height:2em"
! rowspan=6 | 29
| rowspan=6 align=left | Bill Frist
| rowspan=6  | Republican
| rowspan=6 nowrap | Jan 3, 1995 –Jan 3, 2007
| rowspan=3 | Elected in 1994.
| rowspan=3 | 35
| 

|- style="height:2em"
| 
| rowspan=3 | 35
| rowspan=3 | Re-elected to a full term in 1996.Retired.

|- style="height:2em"
| 

|- style="height:2em"
| rowspan=3 | Re-elected in 2000.Retired.
| rowspan=3 | 36
| 

|- style="height:2em"
| 
| rowspan=3 | 36
| rowspan=3 | Elected in 2002.
| rowspan=9 nowrap | Jan 3, 2003 –Jan 3, 2021
| rowspan=9  | Republican
| rowspan=9 align=right | Lamar Alexander
! rowspan=9 | 37

|- style="height:2em"
| 

|- style="height:2em"
! rowspan=6 | 30
| rowspan=6 align=left | Bob Corker
| rowspan=6  | Republican
| rowspan=6 nowrap | Jan 3, 2007 –Jan 3, 2019 
| rowspan=3 | Elected in 2006.
| rowspan=3 | 37
| 

|- style="height:2em"
| 
| rowspan=3 | 37
| rowspan=3 | Re-elected in 2008.

|- style="height:2em"
| 

|- style="height:2em"
| rowspan=3 | Re-elected in 2012.Retired.
| rowspan=3 | 38
| 

|- style="height:2em"
| 
| rowspan=3 | 38 
| rowspan=3 | Re-elected in 2014.Retired.

|- style="height:2em"
| 

|- style="height:2em"
! rowspan=3 | 31
| rowspan=3 align=left | Marsha Blackburn
| rowspan=3  | Republican
| rowspan=3 nowrap | Jan 3, 2019 – Present
| rowspan=3 | Elected in 2018.
| rowspan=3 | 39
| 

|- style="height:2em"
| 
| rowspan=3 | 39
| rowspan=3 | Elected in 2020.
| rowspan=3 nowrap | Jan 3, 2021 –Present
| rowspan=3  | Republican
| rowspan=3 align=right | Bill Hagerty
! rowspan=3 | 38

|- style="height:2em"
| 

|- style="height:2em"
| rowspan=2 colspan=5 | To be determined in the 2024 election.
| rowspan=2|40
| 

|- style="height:2em"
| 
| 40
| colspan=5 | To be determined in the 2026 election.

See also

 United States congressional delegations from Tennessee
 List of United States representatives from Tennessee
 Elections in Tennessee

Notes

References
 

 
U.S. senators
Tennessee